Major-General Austin Timeous Miller CB MC & Bar was born on 28 July 1888. He was the son of Joseph Miller, J.P., of Bedford. He was educated at Bedford School and Gonville and Caius College, Cambridge. He entered the Indian Army on 28 August 1910 as a 2nd lieutenant in the 10th Duke of Cambridge’s Own Lancers (Hodson’s Horse), and was advanced to lieutenant in December 1911.

On the outbreak of war he transferred to the Sherwood Foresters (Notts. & Derby. Regiment). He was appointed Adjutant and in January 1915 was made a Temporary Captain. Serving with the 1st Battalion he entered the France/Flanders theatre of war on 1 March 1915 and soon after was awarded the M.C. for his bravery and leadership in action. He subsequently served as a brigade major in France, November 1915-February 1917 and as G.S.O.2, February 1917-October 1918. For his services he was given the brevet of major in January 1918; was three times mentioned in despatches; awarded a Bar to his M.C. and awarded the French Croix de Guerre.

He subsequently served as an instructor at the Staff School, Cambridge and as G.S.O.2 in France and with the Rhine Army until June 1919. Miller then held appointments as brigade major in England, with the Rhine Army and in India. He was promoted Brevet lieutenant-colonel in July 1929 and lieutenant-colonel in January 1936. Appointed C.O. of the 1st Battalion Sherwood Foresters, 1936-37. Promoted to colonel in October 1937, he was appointed G.S.O.1 Northern Command until 31 September 1939.

Promoted to acting brigadier on 1 October 1939 and temporary brigadier in March 1940, he was in command of 164 Infantry Brigade, Home Forces until April 1941. Miller also served as A.D.C. to the King, February 1940-November 1941. He was appointed D.A.& Q.M.G. Scottish Command, April–May 1941. Promoted to acting major-general in April 1941 and confirmed in that rank in November 1941. At that rank he was in charge of Administration of the Scottish Command until his retirement in 1945. For his wartime services he was appointed a Companion of the Order of the Bath in 1942.

Major-General Miller remained in the Regular Army Reserve of Officers until his death on 16 May 1947.

Military awards
The Most Honourable Order of the Bath, C.B. (Military) Companion’s neck badge; Military Cross, G.V.R., with Second Award Bar; 1914-15 Star (Lieut., Notts. & Derby. R.); British War and Victory Medals, M.I.D. oak leaf (Major); Defence and War Medals; France, Croix de Guerre 1914-18

C.B. London Gazette 11 June 1942.

M.C. London Gazette 3 July 1915. ‘When owing to high explosive shells falling for fourteen hours amongst the battalion, a retirement began, he immediately ran along the line under heavy fire, stopped the retirement, and by his coolness and personal example saved the situation.’

Bar to M.C. London Gazette 4 February 1918.

M.I.D. London Gazette 1 January 1916; 4 January 1917; 11 December 1917.

Croix de Guerre London Gazette 17 December 1917.

References

Recipients of the Military Cross
People educated at Bedford School
Alumni of Gonville and Caius College, Cambridge
1888 births
1947 deaths
British people in colonial India